Mathi is a village in the Kumbakonam taluk of Thanjavur district, Tamil Nadu, India.

Demographics 

As per the 2001 census, Mathi had a total population of 1588 with 788 males and 800 females. The sex ratio was 1015. The literacy rate was 75.64

References 

 

Villages in Thanjavur district